Jacques Myard (born 14 August 1947) is a French politician and former diplomat who represented the 5th constituency of the Yvelines department in the National Assembly from 1993 to 2017. A member of The Republicans (LR), he has served as Mayor of Maisons-Laffitte since 1989.

Political career
In 1983, Myard entered the municipal council of Maisons-Laffitte, Yvelines for the Rally for the Republic. In 1989, he was elected to the mayorship of Maisons-Laffitte. In the 1993 legislative election, he was elected to the National Assembly in the 5th constituency of Yvelines.

Myard made international news when on 17 July 2012, just days before the vote on a new sexual harassment bill, male lawmakers in the National Assembly including Myard hooted and made catcalls as Housing Minister Cécile Duflot, wearing a floral dress, spoke about an architectural project. Myard told L'Express that the hoots were a way of "paying homage to this woman's beauty".

In 2015 he visited Damascus with three fellow politicians, where he met with Syrian President Bashar al-Assad and other officials. Myard said he discounted the opinion that the unofficial visit was misguided, stating to be "told not to talk to the devil", but thinking "the devil says clever things". He further stated that although he was not Bashar al-Assad's "lawyer"—"I do not excuse the massacres", recognising that "the regime used chemical weapons"—he thought "with a diplomacy of morality, we no longer speak to anyone". One of the trip's partakers, Socialist Gérard Bapt, who was the sole participant who refused to meet with Bashar al-Assad, stated the two others, Jean-Pierre Vial and François Zocchetto, were dissatisfied with Myard's attitude following their return to Paris.

On 5 April 2016, Myard announced a run for The Republicans presidential primary; he later failed to gather enough signatures to appear on the ballot.

He lost his seat to Yaël Braun-Pivet of La République En Marche! in the 2017 legislative election. He left The Republicans in 2018 to join Debout la France before returning in 2020.

Political positions
Myard has voiced his opposition to same-sex marriage.

He has expressed support for Rattachism.

Following the 2022 legislative election, Myard called for the formation of an electoral alliance between The Republicans, the National Rally and Reconquête in order to counter the new left-wing New People's Ecologist and Social Union (NUPES) alliance.

References

1947 births
Living people
20th-century French diplomats
Politicians from Île-de-France
People from Lyon
Rally for the Republic politicians
Union for a Popular Movement politicians
The Republicans (France) politicians
The Popular Right
Debout la France politicians
Mayors of places in Île-de-France
Paris 2 Panthéon-Assas University alumni
Graduate Institute of International and Development Studies alumni
Deputies of the 12th National Assembly of the French Fifth Republic
Deputies of the 13th National Assembly of the French Fifth Republic
Deputies of the 14th National Assembly of the French Fifth Republic